Ligueux is a former commune in the Dordogne department in southwestern France. On 1 January 2016, it was merged into the new commune Sorges et Ligueux en Périgord.

Population

See also
Communes of the Dordogne department

References

Former communes of Dordogne